Norman Mason Fletcher (2 October 1884 – 22 December 1938) was an Australian rules footballer who played with Geelong in the Victorian Football League (VFL).

Notes

External links 

1884 births
1938 deaths
Australian rules footballers from Geelong
Geelong Football Club players